Mihajlo Mitić (born July 20, 1987) is a Serbian professional basketball coach.

Coaching career 
Mitić coached Spartak and Pirot.

In 2016, Vršac has added Mitić to their coaching staff as an assistant coach. He became a head coach for Vršac prior to the 2018 Serbian SuperLeague season. He left the post after the end of the 2017–18 season.

In November 2018, Mitić became a youth coach for Bayern Munich. In July 2019, Bayern Munich II of the German ProB has added Mitić to their coaching staff as an assistant coach.

References

External links 
 Profile at eurobasket.com
 Mihajlo Mitić at 2basketballbundesliga.de
 

1987 births
Living people
KK Pirot coaches
KK Spartak Subotica coaches
KK Vršac coaches
People from Pirot
Serbian expatriate basketball people in Germany
Serbian expatriate basketball people in Montenegro
Serbian men's basketball coaches
University of Niš alumni